Vaccinium bissei is a species of plant in the family Ericaceae. It is endemic to Cuba.

References

Flora of Cuba
bissei
Vulnerable plants
Taxonomy articles created by Polbot